NSC TV is a Brazilian regional television network that operates in the state of Santa Catarina. The network, whose acronym stands for Nossa Santa Catarina (English: "Our Santa Catarina"), is an affiliate of Rede Globo.

NSC TV owns six affiliates in Santa Catarina, and the network's headquarters is in Florianópolis.

History

Beginning in 1979, Grupo RBS was the owner of six Rede Globo-affiliated television stations in Santa Catarina; those affiliates were operated as part of the RBS TV network. However, in 2011, Grupo RBS began to experience financial problems when its employees began to be detained for crimes against the country's national financial system as part of Operation Zelotes. Over the next four years, the group terminated the contracts of dozens of employees and rumors began to build about a potential sale of RBS TV's affiliates.

On March 7, 2016, RBS announced that its affiliates that are based in Santa Catarina would be sold to a new ownership group headed by the owner of Grupo NC. The sale was approved by CADE on July 15.

In October 2016, Grupo NC began to drop all instances of the RBS TV name from its newly acquired television affiliates. On August 15, 2017, those affiliates formed a new regional network under the name NSC TV.

Broadcasters

Local programs
Bom Dia Santa Catarina (local version of Bom Dia Brasil)
Jornal do Almoço
Globo Esporte SC (local version of Globo Esporte)
NSC Notícias

References

External links
 Official website 

Television networks in Brazil
Santa Catarina (state)
TV Globo affiliates
1979 establishments in Brazil
Television channels and stations established in 1979